The 2019–20 Washington State Cougars men's basketball team represented Washington State University during the 2019–20 NCAA Division I men's basketball season. The team was led by first-year head coach Kyle Smith. The Cougars played their home games at the Beasley Coliseum in Pullman, Washington as members in the Pac-12 Conference. They finished the season 16–16, 6–12 in Pac-12 play to finish in 11th place. They defeated Colorado in the first round of the Pac-12 tournament and were set to face Arizona State in the quarterfinals before the remainder of the Pac-12 Tournament was cancelled amid the COVID-19 pandemic. On March 12, all other conference tournaments and postseason tournaments were cancelled, making the Cougars win over Colorado on March 11 the final game to be completed in the 2019–20 basketball season.

Previous season
The Cougars finished the 2018–19 season  11–21, 4–14 in Pac-12 play to finish in 11th place. They lost in the first round of the Pac-12 tournament to the eventual tournament champion Oregon.

At the conclusion of the season, head coach Ernie Kent was fired. On March 27, 2019, the school hired former San Francisco Dons head coach Kyle Smith as the new head coach.

Offseason

Departures

Incoming transfers

2019 recruiting class

Roster

Schedule and results

|-
!colspan=9 style=| Non-conference regular season

|-
!colspan=9 style=| Pac-12 regular season

|-
!colspan=9 style=| Pac-12 Tournament

References

Washington State
Washington State Cougars men's basketball seasons
Washington State
Washington State